Jon Azkargorta Aretxabala (born in Algorta, Getxo, on 3 May 1963) is a Spanish former rugby union player. He played as centre or as fullback. He was nicknamed "Azkar".

Career
Azkargorta always played for Getxo Artea RT from his hometown. He formed part the only División de Honor title on the club's cabinet, in the 1992–93 season, and several Copa del Rey titles. In 1986 he was one of the members of the first Spain sevens team. He is the second player with most caps (76) in the story of the Spain national team, only after Francisco Puertas. He was first capped against Argentina in Madrid, on 23 November 1982 and his last cap was against Wales national rugby union team on 21 May 1994, also played at Estadio Nacional Complutense.

Personal life
Azkargorta is a physical education teacher at the University of the Basque Country.

Notes

External links
 
 

1963 births
Living people
Rugby union players from the Basque Country (autonomous community)
Spanish rugby union players
Rugby union centres
Rugby union fullbacks
Sportspeople from Getxo
Spain international rugby union players